Owens Wells is an unincorporated community in Holmes County, Mississippi, United States. The community was once a stop on the Yazoo and Mississippi Valley Railroad.

History
Owens Wells was once home to a mineral spring and resort. A hotel was built near the spring that was frequented by citizens of the Delta. The resort could accommodate up to 150 guests and the springs were purported to cure "torpid liver, malaria, chills and fever, indigestion, dyspepsia, biliousness, general debility, constipation, all forms of kidney trouble...and piles." The spring was still producing usable mineral water in 1915.

A post office operated under the name Owens Wells from 1889 to 1919.

In 1910, Governor Edmond Noel gave a speech in Owens Wells that summarized his tenure as governor until that point.

Gallery

References

Unincorporated communities in Holmes County, Mississippi
Unincorporated communities in Mississippi
Resort towns